is a city located on the southern tip of Satsuma Peninsula, in Kagoshima Prefecture, Japan. As of March 31, 2011, the city has an estimated population of 39,738, with 17,288 households and a population density of 111.05 per km². The total area is 357.85 km².

The modern city of Minamikyūshū was established on December 1, 2007, from the merger of the town of Ei (from Ibusuki District), and the towns of Chiran and Kawanabe (both from Kawanabe District).

Notable people from Minamikyūshū
 Hiroko Yamasaki, former Japanese rhythmic gymnast.

References

External links
 
 Minamikyūshū City official website 

Cities in Kagoshima Prefecture